Krosshø is a mountain in Skjåk Municipality in Innlandet county, Norway. The mountain is surrounded by several other notable mountains including Hellstugueggi to the northwest, Tordsnose to the north, and Vulueggi to the east. The lake Breiddalsvatnet lies just south of the mountain.

See also
List of mountains of Norway

References

Skjåk
Mountains of Innlandet